Parliamentary elections were held in Transnistria on 12 December 2010. All 43 seats of the Supreme Council of Transnistria were up for election. Transnistria uses first past the post with 43 single seat constituencies.

In preparation for the election, boundaries of the electoral constituencies were reviewed and revised in September 2010.

International observers
The Supreme Council passed a resolution on 27 October to invite international observers to monitor the election. MPs invited the members of the Federation Council, the State Duma, Russia's Electoral Commission, the Ukrainian Verkhovna Rada, the Parliament of Abkhazia, South Ossetia, North Ossetia-Alania, Artsakh, as well as the European Parliament, the OSCE and the Council of Europe.

Observers present included representatives from Abkhazia, Artsakh, Germany and Poland.

According to official data, 22 of the 43 members of its parliament (MPs) were born on the territory of PMR, while 4 were born in  Moldova, 7 were born in Russia, 6 in Ukraine and 4 did not declare.

Result
According to the results, overall turnout was 43%, with Constituency #11 (located in Rîbnița District) reporting 70.1%, the highest in the country. In this district, Sheriff founder Ilya Kazmaly swept the vote, being re-elected with 97.85% (also the highest in the country). The lowest turnout was in Constituency #2 (Bendery), with 29.3%.

Results for 42 constituencies were announced on 13 December, with one recount going on, in Constituency #27 (in Slobozia District). The election here was won by Oleg Vasilaty, who took 35.84% of the vote, only slightly more than the number of votes "against all", which was the highest in the country at 31.5%.

According to the provisional results, Renewal has won the election, taking 25 out of 43 seats in parliament. Yevgeny Shevchuk, Mikhail Burla and Anatoliy Kaminski, leaders of Renewal, were among those (re-)elected.

The Pridnestrovie Communist Party got its first seat in parliament after its leader Oleg Khorzhan was elected in Constituency #40 (Tiraspol), defeating Renewal deputy leader Olga Gukalenko.

Aftermath
The Supreme Council held its first session in the new composition on 29 December 2010. In this session, Anatoly Kaminski was re-elected as speaker.

References

External links
Transnistrian Central Electoral Commission (in Russian)

Elections in Transnistria
2010 elections in Moldova
2010 in Transnistria
Election and referendum articles with incomplete results